David Anthony Noel III (born February 27, 1984) is an American retired professional basketball player and current assistant coach of the Capital City Go-Go of the NBA G League.  A graduate of the University of North Carolina, Noel was drafted by the Milwaukee Bucks in the second round of the 2006 NBA draft with their lone pick, 39th overall.

Noel averaged 2.7 points, 1.8 rebounds, and 1.0 assists per game during his sole season with the Bucks. On January 20, 2008, David Noel joined the Tulsa 66ers of the NBDL. On November 7, 2008, he was selected with the 14th pick in the first round of the 2008 NBA D-League Draft by the Albuquerque Thunderbirds.

On March 2, 2009, Noel was traded to the Reno Bighorns for Antonio Meeking.

Later that year, Noel was chosen by the Barangay Ginebra Kings team of the Philippine Basketball Association (PBA) to be their import.

Noel played with the French team Chorale Roanne Basket during the 2009-10 season.
  He then played two seasons with Paris-Levallois Basket, the second alongside former North Carolina teammate Jawad Williams.  On September 25, 2012, BCM Gravelines announced that they had signed Noel. He left them in February 2013.

On March 1, 2013, he signed with Edymax SPU Nitra in Slovakia. In June 2013, he returned to France and signed a one-year deal with Orléans Loiret Basket.

On August 31, 2017 Noel announced his retirement from basketball as he was named head coach for his alma mater, Southern High School in Durham, North Carolina.

Awards
College Slam Dunk Champion: 2006
PBA Slam Dunk Champion: 2009
PBA All-Star MVP: 2009

Notes

External links

NBA Development League: David Noel Playerfile @ nba.com
Bucks Back When ... David Noel @ nba.com
New Ginebra Import @ pba.ph
Paris-Levallois page on Eurobasket.com

1984 births
Living people
African-American basketball players
Albuquerque Thunderbirds players
American expatriate basketball people in France
American expatriate basketball people in the Philippines
American expatriate basketball people in Slovakia
American expatriate basketball people in Spain
American men's basketball players
Barangay Ginebra San Miguel players
Basketball coaches from North Carolina
Basketball players from North Carolina
BCM Gravelines players
Capital City Go-Go coaches
Cholet Basket players
Chorale Roanne Basket players
High school basketball coaches in the United States
Joventut Badalona players
Liga ACB players
Metropolitans 92 players
Milwaukee Bucks draft picks
Milwaukee Bucks players
North Carolina Tar Heels men's basketball players
Orléans Loiret Basket players
Philippine Basketball Association All-Stars
Philippine Basketball Association imports
Reno Bighorns players
Small forwards
Sportspeople from Durham, North Carolina
Tulsa 66ers players
21st-century African-American sportspeople
20th-century African-American people